Sir George Rainy, KCSI, KCIE (11 February 1875 – 27 January 1946) was a British colonial administrator in India. A member of the Indian Civil Service, he was member of the Governor-General's Executive Council in charge of the Commerce and Railway Departments from 1927 to 1932.

References 

 

1875 births
1946 deaths
Indian Civil Service (British India) officers
Knights Commander of the Order of the Star of India
Knights Commander of the Order of the Indian Empire
People educated at Edinburgh Academy
Alumni of Merton College, Oxford
Members of the Council of the Governor General of India
British people in colonial India